Amphithemis is a genus of dragonflies in the family Libellulidae.

Species:
Amphithemis curvistyla  Cambodia, Thailand
Amphithemis kerri  Laos
Amphithemis vacillans  India

References

External links

Libellulidae
Anisoptera genera
Odonata of Asia